= Battle of Pigeon Hill =

Battle of Pigeon Hill may refer to:

- Battle of Kennesaw Mountain(1864), during the American Civil War
- Pigeon Hill Raid (1866), during the Fenian raids in eastern Canada
